Queenscliff is the terminal railway station of the Queenscliff branch line that originally branched off the main Warrnambool line near South Geelong in Victoria, Australia. The station was originally opened on 21 May 1879, the current station building constructed in 1881 and is listed on the Victorian Heritage Register.

The station was linked to Swan Island by a 3 foot gauge tramway for transport of goods between the years of 1886 and 1958.

The station was closed to all Victorian Railways services on 6 November 1976. After this date, usage of the branch line was granted to the Bellarine Peninsula Railway who re-gauged part of the track to 3'6" and commenced tourist operations from the station in May 1979 to Laker's Siding, and to Drysdale not long after. The section of the line between the Warrnambool line at South Geelong and Drysdale is no longer serviceable and much of that track bed is now part of the Bellarine Rail Trail.

References

Victoria (Australia) tourist railway stations
Bellarine Peninsula
Victorian Heritage Register
Listed railway stations in Australia
Railway stations in Australia opened in 1879
Borough of Queenscliffe
Victorian Heritage Register Barwon South West (region)